Ursicollum is a fungal genus in the family Cryphonectriaceae. A monotypic genus, Ursicollum contains the single species Ursicollum fallax.

References

External links

Monotypic Sordariomycetes genera
Diaporthales